is a Japanese actress and former gravure idol. She is represented with YMN. Her husband is professional baseball player Kyohei Nakamura of the Hiroshima Toyo Carps.

Biography
2009
Shimizu was elected in the Nittelegenic 2009.
She was chosen at Gravure Japan's semi-Grand Prix.
2010
Shimizu served as a supporter girl for the 2010 Winter Olympics.
She participated for the Tokyo Marathon 2010.
In July 2012, Shimizu transferred her affiliated office from Feather International to YMN.
2017
In 1 February, it was revealed that she will marry professional baseball player Kyohei Nakamura of the Hiroshima Toyo Carps in 2 February. In 2 February, she announced that she had a marriage registration with Nakamura on her blog, along with this she graduated from being a gravure idol.

Videography

Filmography

Television

Advertisements

Radio

Films

Stage

Internet

Fashion shows

Advertising model

Music videos

Direct-to-video

Bibliography

Photo albums

Magazines

References

External links
 – YMF 
Yuko Shimizu no Blog – Ameba Blog 

Actresses from Kanagawa Prefecture
Japanese gravure idols
1988 births
Living people
21st-century Japanese actresses
Japanese television actresses
Japanese film actresses